Lu Qi is the name of:

Lu Qi (Tang dynasty) ( 8th century), Tang dynasty official
Lu Qi (actor) (born 1953), Chinese actor
Qi Lu (computer scientist) or Lu Qi (born 1961), Chinese computer scientist